Peter J. Connell  (1862 – May 5, 1892) was an American baseball player. He played in one game for the 1886 New York Metropolitans and in 11 games for the 1890 Brooklyn Gladiators, both in the American Association.

External links

1862 births
1892 deaths
Sportspeople from Brooklyn
Baseball players from New York City
Major League Baseball third basemen
New York Metropolitans players
19th-century baseball players
Brooklyn Gladiators players
Springfield (minor league baseball) players
Wilmington Blue Hens players
Atlantic City (minor league baseball) players
Danbury Hatters players
Kalamazoo Kazoos players
London Tecumsehs (baseball) players
Des Moines Prohibitionists players
Burials at Holy Cross Cemetery, Brooklyn